Lycée Choiseul  is a senior high school/sixth-form college in Tours, Indre-et-Loire, France.

The school includes a boarding facility.

The École Supérieure « Sévigné » first opened in 1884 with 50 students, and it became the Collège de Jeunes Filles, a school for girls. It had 777 students in 1939 and 1,801 students in 1959. By 1960 it was called the Collège national moderne et technique and received its current name shortly afterward. In 1972 the school became coeducational.

References

External links
 Lycée Choiseul 
  

Lycées in Indre-et-Loire
Boarding schools in France
Buildings and structures in Tours, France
Education in Tours, France
1884 establishments in France
Educational institutions established in 1884